Five Easy Pieces (輪流傳) is a TVB television series, premiered on 4 August 1980. Theme song "Five Easy Pieces" (輪流傳) composition and arrangement by Joseph Koo, lyricist by Wong Jim, sung by Adam Cheng.

1980 Hong Kong television series debuts
1980 Hong Kong television series endings
1980s Hong Kong television series
TVB dramas
Cantonese-language television shows
Unfinished creative works